The Serie B 1941–42 was the thirteenth tournament of this competition played in Italy since its creation.

Teams
Pro Patria, Fiumana, Prato and Pescara had been promoted from Serie C, while Novara and Bari had been relegated from Serie A.

Final classification

Results

References and sources

Almanacco Illustrato del Calcio - La Storia 1898-2004, Panini Edizioni, Modena, September 2005

Serie B seasons
2
Italy